Kosmos 37 ( meaning Cosmos 37) or Zenit-2 No.22 was a Soviet, first generation, low resolution, optical film-return reconnaissance satellite launched in 1964.

Kosmos 37 was launched by a Vostok-2 rocket, serial number R15001-04, flying from Site 31/6 at the Baikonur Cosmodrome. The launch took place at 09:36 GMT on 14 August 1964, and following its successful arrival in orbit the spacecraft received its Kosmos designation, along with the International Designator 1964-044A and the Satellite Catalog Number 00848.

During the mission one of the satellite's film reels snapped, resulting in the associated camera only taking some of the images it had been programmed to produce. The mission has been partially complete because there was a break in the film of the SA-10 camera. On 22 August 1964, after eight days in orbit, Kosmos 37 was deorbited with its return capsule descending by parachute for recovery by Soviet forces.

References

Kosmos satellites
Spacecraft launched in 1964
Spacecraft which reentered in 1964
Zenit-2 satellites